Romas Dressler (born 16 October 1987) is a German former professional footballer who played as a forward. He played for Hamburger SV II, Olba, Lucchese, Greuther Fürth II, Wuppertaler SV Borussia, Chemnitzer FC, Wormatia Worms, SSV Jahn Regensburg, SV Eintracht Trier 05 and FC Kray.

References

External links
 
 

1987 births
Living people
German footballers
Association football forwards
3. Liga players
Hamburger SV II players
SpVgg Greuther Fürth players
Olbia Calcio 1905 players
S.S.D. Lucchese 1905 players
Wuppertaler SV players
Chemnitzer FC players
SSV Jahn Regensburg players
SSV Jahn Regensburg II players
SV Eintracht Trier 05 players
FC Kray players
1. FC Bocholt players
German expatriate footballers
German expatriate sportspeople in Italy
Expatriate footballers in Italy